In the First Battle of Wissembourg (13 October 1793) an Allied army commanded by Dagobert Sigmund von Wurmser attacked the French Army of the Rhine under Jean Pascal Carlenc. After an ineffectual resistance, the French army abandoned its fortified line behind the Lauter River and retreated toward Strasbourg in confusion.

After the siege of Mainz in which the Prussian army captured the city, the Army of the Rhine fell back into the Lines of Weissenburg, a position first fortified in 1706. Soon Wurmser with an army composed of troops from Habsburg monarchy, French Royalists and allied German states began putting pressure on the Lines. Meanwhile, the French army organization was in disarray after two previous army commanders were arrested and sent to Paris prisons. Since no one wanted to lead the army, the representatives on mission appointed Carlenc, recently a lieutenant colonel of cavalry. After a series of skirmishes, Wurmser launched a successful assault. After the French retreat, the inept Carlenc was arrested and replaced in army command by Jean-Charles Pichegru. At the urging of the government, Pichegru began launching a series of attacks designed to recover the lost territory. These resulted in the battles of Froeschwiller and Second Wissembourg.

Background
During the War of the First Coalition, General der Kavallerie Wurmser's Austro-Allied army threatened to invade Alsace. Accordingly, the French Army of the Rhine manned the Lines of Weissenburg, a line of earthworks dating back to the War of the Spanish Succession. The lines began near Wissembourg and stretched about 20 kilometers in an east-southeasterly direction to the Rhine River at Lauterbourg. This traces the modern-day France-Germany border.

During this period, the Army of the Rhine's command structure remained chaotic.  In July 1793, Adam Philippe Custine was replaced in command; he was guillotined at the end of August. General of Division (MG) Charles de Landremont became commander on 18 August and served until 29 September when he was arrested for treason. Unlike his predecessor MG Alexandre, vicomte de Beauharnais who was guillotined in July 1794, Landremont survived the experience, dying in 1818. MG Meunier took command for two days until his replacement by MG Jean Carlenc on 2 October. MG Charles Pichegru replaced Carlenc on 27 October. At the same time, MG Lazare Hoche assumed overall command of both the Army of the Moselle and Pichegru's Army of the Rhine.

On 20 August, a column made up of Habsburgs, Hessians, and French Émigrés clashed with 3,000 French at Jockgrim on the Rhine north of Lauterbourg. Feldmarschal-Leutnant Moritz Kavanaugh's Allied force included five infantry battalions, six light infantry companies, 13 cavalry squadrons, and 12 cannons. French General of Brigade Louis-Théobald Ilher led three battalions, six squadrons, and 10 guns. The Allies had the better of the encounter, losing 147 casualties. The French lost 103 men and 5 cannons captured, plus an unknown number of killed and wounded. While leading some dragoons, Ilher was killed by a Hessian Jäger. A flurry of actions followed as Wurmser drove in the French outposts and tapped at the main lines. Skirmishes occurred on 21 and 27 August, and on 7, 11, 12, 14, 19, 20, 23, and 30 September.

On 12 and 20 September, two battalions of the Kaiser Infantry Regiment led by Oberst (Colonel) Gerhard Rosselmini clashed with the French at Bad Bergzabern and Bienwaldmuhle.

Battle

French Army
 Army of the Rhine: General of Division Jean Carlenc (45,312 infantry, 6,278 cavalry)
 Advance Guard: General of Division Jean-Baptiste Meynier
 Brigade: General of Brigade Augustin Isambert
 Brigade: General of Brigade Ferette (?)
 Brigade: General of Brigade Jean-François Combez
 Right Wing: General of Brigade Paul-Alexis Dubois
 Brigade: General of Brigade Claude Ignace François Michaud
 Brigade: General of Brigade Claude Legrand
 Center: General of Division Louis Dominique Munnier
 Brigade: General of Brigade Martial Vachot
 Center: General of Division Jean Nicolas Méquillet
 Brigade: General of Brigade Bauriolle (?)
 Brigade: General of Brigade Isambert
 Left Wing: General of Division Claude Ferey 
 Brigade: General of Brigade Louis Desaix
 Reserve: General of Division Dominique Diettmann
 Brigade: General of Brigade Barthélemy de La Farelle
 Brigade: General of Brigade Jean-François Ravel de Puycontal

Habsburg-Allied Army
 Allied Army: GdK Dagobert von Wurmser (33,599 infantry, 9,635 cavalry)
 1st Column: FML Christian, Prince of Waldeck und Pyrmont
 Brigade: GM Adam Lichtenberg
 Brigade: GM Karl Funk von Senftenau
 2nd Column: FML Friedrich Freiherr von Hotze
 Brigade: OB Franjo Jelačić
 Brigade: GM Alexander Jordis
 Brigade: GM Karl Aufsess
 3rd Column: FML Hotze
 Brigade: OBL Ignác Gyulay
 Brigade: OB Johann von Klenau
 4th Column: GM Johann Mészáros von Szoboszló
 Brigade: OB Sell von Pellegrini
 Brigade: GM Johann Mészáros von Szoboszló
 5th Column: GM Karl Brunner von Hirschbrunn
 6th Column: GM Siegfried Kospoth
 7th Column: Louis Joseph de Bourbon, prince de Condé
 Brigade: GM Viomenil
 Key
 GdK = Austrian General der Kavallerie commands an army or corps
 FML = Austrian Feldmarschal-Leutnant commands a corps or division
 GM = Austrian General-Major commands a brigade
 OB = Austrian Oberst (colonel) commands a regiment
 OBL = Austrian Oberst-Leutnant (lieutenant colonel) is second in command of a regiment

Action

On 13 October 1793, Wurmser launched his main assault against the fortified French positions. The Allied forces succeeded in breaching the line, forcing a French withdrawal south to Hagenau. The French suffered 2,000 killed and wounded, plus 1,000 soldiers, 31 guns, and 12 colors captured. The Allies suffered 1,800 casualties. The day after the battle, an Allied force under Franz von Lauer laid siege to the nearby Fort-Louis in the Rhine river. The 4,500-man French garrison surrendered the fortress on 14 November. The French government quickly rushed Hoche's Army of the Moselle into the area to help drive back Wurmser. This move precipitated the Second Battle of Wissembourg in December 1793.

References

Further reading
 Smith, Digby. The Napoleonic Wars Data Book. London: Greenhill, 1998. 
 Wrede, Alphons. Geschichte der K. und K. Wehrmacht, Vol. 1. Vienna: L. W. Seidel & Sohn, 1898.

External links
 French Wikipedia: Armée du Rhin
 French Wikipedia: French generals
 napoleon-series.org Austrian generals by Digby Smith, compiled by Leopold Kudrna

Battles involving Austria
Battles involving Hesse-Kassel
Conflicts in 1793
1793 in France
1793 in Austria
Battles of the War of the First Coalition
Battles in Grand Est
Battles inscribed on the Arc de Triomphe